Elon Jones (born 28 October 1960) is a Barbadian cricketer. He played in two List A matches for the Barbados cricket team in 1986/87.

See also
 List of Barbadian representative cricketers

References

External links
 

1960 births
Living people
Barbadian cricketers
Barbados cricketers
People from Saint Peter, Barbados